Micropterigoidea is the superfamily of "mandibulate archaic moths", all placed in the single family Micropterigidae, containing currently about twenty living genera. They are considered the most primitive extant lineage of lepidoptera (Kristensen, 1999), and the sole superfamily in the suborder Zeugloptera. The name comes from the Greek for mikros, little and pterux, a wing. Unique among the Lepidoptera, these moths have chewing mouthparts rather than a proboscis, and are seen feeding, often in large aggregations, on the pollen of the flowers of many herbaceous plants, shrubs and trees. The fossil record of the group goes back to the middle-late Jurassic with the earliest known species being Auliepterix from the Karabastau Formation in Kazakhstan.

Genera 

 Micropterix Hübner, 1825
 Epimartyria Walsingham, 1898
 Issikiomartyria Hashimoto, 2006
 Kurokopteryx Hashimoto, 2006
 Neomicropteryx Issiki, 1931
 Palaeomicroides Issiki, 1931
 Paramartyria Issiki, 1931
 Vietomartyria Mey, 1997
 Sabatinca Walker, 1863
 Agrionympha Meyrick, 1921
 Hypomartyria Kristensen & Nielsen 1982
 Squamicornia Kristensen & Nielsen, 1982
 Austromartyria Gibbs, 2010
 Tasmantrix Gibbs, 2010
 Zealandopterix Gibbs, 2010
 Aureopterix Gibbs, 2010
 Nannopterix Gibbs, 2010

Extinct genera 

 †Archmosaicus Zhang, Deng et Ren, 2020 Burmese amber, Myanmar, Cenomanian
† Auliepterix Kozlov, 1989 Karabastau Formation, Kazakhstan, Callovian/Oxfordian Hotont Formation, Mongolia, Aptian
 † Baltimartyria Skalski, 1995 Baltic amber, Eocene
 †Electrocrania Kuznetsov 1941 Baltic amber, Eocene
 † Moleropterix Engel & Kinzelbach, 2008 Fur Formation, Denmark, Ypresian
 † Palaeosabatinca Kozlov, 1989 Zaza Formation, Russia, Aptian
 † Parasabatinca Whalley, 1978 Lebanese amber, Barremian, Crato Formation, Brazil, Aptian

References 

 Kristensen, N. P., and E. S. Nielsen. 1979. A new subfamily of micropterigid moths from South America. A contribution to the morphology and phylogeny of the Micropterigidae, with a generic catalogue of the family (Lepidoptera: Zeugloptera). Steenstrupia 5(7):69–147.
 Kristensen, N. P. (1999). The non-Glossatan Moths. Ch. 4, pp. 41–49 in Kristensen, N. P. (Ed.). Lepidoptera, Moths and Butterflies. Volume 1: Evolution, Systematics, and Biogeography. Handbuch der Zoologie. Eine Naturgeschichte der Stämme des Tierreiches / Handbook of Zoology. A Natural History of the phyla of the Animal Kingdom. Band / Volume IV Arthropoda: Insecta Teilband / Part 35: 491 pp. Walter de Gruyter, Berlin, New York.

Sources 
 O'Toole, Christopher. 2002. Firefly Encyclopedia of Insects and Spiders. .

External links 

 Tree of Life
 Microleps U.S.A. Nearctic
 Watson, L., and Dallwitz, M.J. 2003 onwards. British insects: the families of Lepidoptera. Version: 29 December 2011 Detailed description and figures including wing venation.

 
Moth families
Taxa named by Gottlieb August Wilhelm Herrich-Schäffer